Marvin Smith (born 1961) is an American jazz drummer and composer.

Marvin Smith may also refer to:

 Marvin "Bugalu" Smith (born 1948), American jazz musician
 Marvin Eugene Smith (born 1952), American songwriter and music executive
 Marvin H. Smith (1916–2010), American judge
 Marvin Smith (photographer) (1910–2003), documented Harlem in 1930s–1950s
 Marv Smith (1898–1986), American pro football player, Canton Bulldogs, 1920s
 Marvin W. Smith (1901–1982), American politician from Iowa
 W. Marvin Smith (died 1948), American attorney in U.S. Department of Justice
 Marvin "Sweet Louie" Smith (died 2007), member of R&B group Checkmates, Ltd.